Manisha Yadav (born 11 June 1992) is an Indian actress and model who mainly works in the Tamil film industry. She is best known for her lead role as "Aarthi", a 12th grade student in the 2012 Tamil film Vazhakku Enn 18/9 which first introduced her to the Tamil and Telugu audience as an actress.

Career 
Manisha Yadav was born in Bangalore, Karnataka and is working as a model. She debuted in the film industry through the Tamil film Vazhakku Enn 18/9, which was directed by Balaji Sakthivel. She acted in a Telugu movie Tuneega Tuneega in 2012. In 2013, she was seen in Suseenthiran's Aadhalal Kadhal Seiveer and Karu Pazhaniappan's Jannal Oram. She has completed filming for Pattaya Kelappanum Pandiya and Trisha Illana Nayanthara.

Acting credits

Films 
All films are in Tamil, unless otherwise noted.

References

External links 
 

Indian film actresses
Actresses in Tamil cinema
Actresses from Bangalore
Actresses in Telugu cinema
21st-century Indian actresses
1992 births
Living people